Headquarters is the third album by the Monkees, released in May 1967 after the first season of their television series had concluded. It was the first album on which the group members made substantial songwriting and instrumental contributions, rather than relying on session musicians and professional songwriters. After a struggle for creative autonomy with their record label, the group had been allowed, to a degree, to record by themselves. Headquarters became the group's third consecutive No. 1 album on the Billboard 200 chart and was certified double platinum in the United States with sales of more than two million copies within the first two months of release. It also peaked at No. 2 on the UK charts. It is included in the 2006 book 1001 Albums You Must Hear Before You Die.

Early history and concept

While the original concept of their third album was to follow the same format and production of the first two albums, after the release of More of the Monkees, the group, particularly Michael Nesmith and Peter Tork, was becoming increasingly frustrated by the limited creative input they were allowed by Don Kirshner, and continued to fight for more creative control and independence from him. Kirshner had already begun supervising recording sessions with studio musicians for their third album, with Davy Jones recording vocal tracks for some of the songs, while the group took it upon themselves, independent of Kirshner, to record two songs featuring them both singing and playing ("All of Your Toys" and "The Girl I Knew Somewhere"), as a means of proving to him that they were capable of providing their own musical accompaniment on future albums. Kirshner was adamant that their music should continue to be recorded under the previous albums' recording style, and was desperate to have the group provide further vocal tracks to the pre-recorded songs before their upcoming pre-planned vacations in order to continue their previous chart-topping successes by having the new single displace the current number one song, "I'm a Believer", thereby having the group hold number one and number two positions. As upcoming talks with Kirshner about their concerns continued to be delayed, the group, citing exhaustion from their grueling TV, touring and recording schedule, were unwilling to postpone the vacations and took advantage of the situation by threatening to quit the show, and subsequently the band, unless their demands were met. Micky Dolenz made a last-minute compromise: the group would agree to sing on Kirshner's tracks in exchange for him allowing one of their previously recorded group performance tracks to serve as the B-side. While it seemed that Kirshner would agree, tensions soon came to a head when he released the third single (in Canada), with the Jones' tracks on both sides ("A Little Bit Me, A Little Bit You" and an early version of "She Hangs Out") without the approval of record executives, the show's producers or the group, completely ignoring their request. This was the last straw, and it lead to Kirshner's dismissal from the Monkees project with the group finally being given full creative control of their next album. The single was withdrawn from Canada and pulled from scheduled release in the US. Since "A Little Bit Me, A Little Bit You" was already announced as the next single, it was retained as the A-side and "The Girl I Knew Somewhere" as the B-side (a publishing error prevented "All of Your Toys" from being used), replacing "She Hangs Out". The remaining Kirshner-supervised tracks that had already been finished were discarded, the group was finally given the creative freedom and input they yearned and soon began recording on their third album, free of the restrictions previously imposed by Kirshner.

Release
The album was released on May 22, 1967, and charted at No. 1 in the U.S., only to be replaced the following week by the Beatles' Sgt. Pepper's Lonely Hearts Club Band; it then began a run of 11 consecutive weeks at the No. 2 position as Sgt. Pepper's Lonely Hearts Club Band and Headquarters became the two top-selling records during the legendary "Summer of Love" period.

The album was issued on the compact disc format for the first time by Arista Records in 1989, remixed from the multi-tracks, then later from the original stereo master tape in 1995, with several bonus tracks on Rhino Entertainment. In 2000, Rhino, through its Rhino Handmade division, issued The Headquarters Sessions, a three-disc box set of outtakes from the session as well as the album's original monophonic mix presented in an alternate running order that had been rejected before the album's official release.

In 2007, Rhino issued a two-disc deluxe edition of the album. The CD set was housed in a digipak with a slipcase and featured original album artwork (including replicas of the original Colgems long playing record labels on each disc), as well as a booklet of essays and session information by Monkees historian Andrew Sandoval. The discs contained both the stereo and mono mixes of the album, remastered, as well as alternate mixes and outtakes.

In 2022 a four disc edition was released including the original album in remixed form with tracks from the aborted January 1967 Don Kirshner sessions; the three other discs in the collection include alternate mixes and outtakes previously unreleased.

Album cover
The original rear album cover features a collage of photos including one of the band with producer Chip Douglas and engineer Dick Bogert. However, the photo was mislabeled: it identifies engineer Hank Cicalo as sitting next to Chip Douglas. This is known as the "producers cover". Colgems/RCA corrected the error by substituting a different photo rather than revising the caption. Peter, Micky and Mike were sporting light beards while Davy's shoulder-length hair had been cut off; this has come to be known as the "beard cover". This is the corrected version because it was standard practice for RCA to add an "RE" to the catalog number when any one side of a record sleeve had a revision. The "beard cover" has a catalog number of COS/COM-103 RE.

Track listing

Original 1967 Colgems LP issue

1995 Rhino CD reissue
Tracks 1-14: Original album in stereo

1996 Sundazed LP reissue

2007 Rhino deluxe CD reissue

Disc one

Tracks 1-14: Original Album in Stereo

Disc two

Tracks 1-14: Original Album in Mono

Aborted track listing
The album's preliminary track lineup was compiled shortly after the sessions had ended and would have included the following songs:

Side 1
"For Pete's Sake"
"I'll Spend My Life With You"
"Forget That Girl"
"You Just May Be the One"
"Shades of Gray"
"A Little Bit Me, A Little Bit You"
"Band 6"

Side 2
"Sunny Girlfriend"
"Mr. Webster"
"You Told Me"
"The Girl I Knew Somewhere" [second version]
"Zilch"
"Early Morning Blues and Greens"
"Randy Scouse Git"

"A Little Bit Me, A Little Bit You" and "The Girl I Knew Somewhere" were ultimately substituted with "No Time" and "I Can't Get Her Off My Mind".

Personnel
The Monkees
 Micky Dolenz - vocals, drums, zither, electric rhythm guitar, shaker, timpani
 Davy Jones - vocals, percussion
 Michael Nesmith - vocals; electric and acoustic lead, rhythm, and 12-string guitars; steel guitar, organ
 Peter Tork - vocals; acoustic 12-string and electric guitars; piano, organ, celeste, electric piano, bass, banjo

Additional musicians and production staff
 Chip Douglas - backing vocals, bass, producer
 Hank Cicalo - engineer
 John London - bass
 Jerry Yester - bass
 Frederick Seykora - cello on "Shades of Gray"
 Vincent DeRosa - French horn on "Shades of Gray"

During the early months of 1967, the four Monkees sequestered themselves in the RCA Victor Music Center of the World Studios, on Sunset Boulevard near Vine Street in Hollywood. Some of the songs were written by the four group members, or evolved via their 'jam' sessions. Other songs were written by songwriters Boyce and Hart. Michael Nesmith recruited fellow folk musician Chip Douglas, a member of the Modern Folk Quartet and the Turtles, to produce the album. Douglas, credited under his birth name, Douglas Farthing Hatlelid, also contributed bass guitar and a song, "Forget That Girl".

"You Told Me"
Written by Michael Nesmith
Lead vocal by Michael Nesmith
Backing vocals: Micky Dolenz, Davy Jones, Michael Nesmith, Peter Tork
 Electric 12-String Guitar: Michael Nesmith
Bass: Chip Douglas
Drums: Micky Dolenz
Banjo: Peter Tork
Tambourine: Davy Jones
Zither: Micky Dolenz
Engineered by: Hank Cicalo
The opening parodies the Beatles' "Taxman," from their album Revolver. The two songs also have similar basslines.
Recorded at RCA Victor Studio C, Hollywood, March 3 and 9, 1967

"I'll Spend My Life with You"
Written by Tommy Boyce and Bobby Hart
Lead vocal by Micky Dolenz
Harmony vocals: Peter Tork
Electric 6-String Guitar: Micky Dolenz
Acoustic 12-String Guitar: Peter Tork
Steel Guitar: Michael Nesmith
Bass: Chip Douglas
Tambourine: Davy Jones
Organ: Peter Tork
Celeste: Peter Tork
Engineered by: Hank Cicalo
A remake by the band; the earlier version was recorded during the sessions for More of the Monkees which featured studio musicians
Recorded at RCA Victor Studio C, Hollywood, March 4, 9, 10, 11 and 18, 1967

"Forget That Girl"
Written by Douglas Farthing Hatlelid (aka Chip Douglas)
Lead vocal by Davy Jones
Backing vocals: Micky Dolenz, Davy Jones, Peter Tork, Chip Douglas
Electric 12-String Guitar: Michael Nesmith
Bass: Chip Douglas
Drums: Micky Dolenz
Maracas: Davy Jones
Electric Piano: Peter Tork
Acoustic Guitar: Unknown
Engineered by: Hank Cicalo
Recorded at RCA Victor Studio C, Hollywood, March 7, 8, 9 and 11, 1967

"Band 6"
Written by Micky Dolenz, Davy Jones, Michael Nesmith and Peter Tork
Spoken words by Micky Dolenz and Chip Douglas
Electric Guitar: Peter Tork
Steel Guitar: Michael Nesmith
Drums: Micky Dolenz
Engineered by: Hank Cicalo
A studio exercise, based on the Looney Tunes theme
Recorded at RCA Victor Studio C, Hollywood, March 2, 1967

"You Just May Be the One"
Written by Michael Nesmith
Lead vocal by Michael Nesmith
Harmony vocals: Micky Dolenz
Backing vocals: Micky Dolenz, Davy Jones, Peter Tork, Chip Douglas
Electric 12-String Guitar: Michael Nesmith
Acoustic Guitar: Michael Nesmith
Bass: Peter Tork
Drums: Micky Dolenz
Tambourine: Davy Jones
Engineered by: Hank Cicalo
A remake by the band; an earlier version was recorded during the sessions for the Monkees' debut album; this earlier version was used several times during Season One of the Monkees' television series. It was eventually featured on Missing Links Volume Two and also subsequent reissues of the first album.
This is the only track on Headquarters to feature the four Monkees playing the same instruments they were shown to play on the television show.
Recorded at RCA Victor Studio C, Hollywood, March 16, 1967

"Shades of Gray"
Written by Barry Mann and Cynthia Weil
Lead vocals by Davy Jones and Peter Tork
Backing vocals: Micky Dolenz, Davy Jones, Peter Tork
Steel Guitar: Michael Nesmith
Bass: Jerry Yester
Drums: Micky Dolenz
Tambourine: Davy Jones
Piano: Peter Tork
Maracas: Davy Jones 
Cello: Frederick Seykora
French Horn: Vincent DeRosa
Engineered by: Hank Cicalo
Some compilations credit songwriting to Gerry Goffin and Carole King, and production to Boyce, Hart and Jack Keller.
Recorded at RCA Victor Studio C, Hollywood, March 16, 22 and 23, 1967

"I Can't Get Her Off My Mind"
Written by Tommy Boyce and Bobby Hart
Lead vocal by Davy Jones
Backing vocals: Micky Dolenz
Electric 12-String Guitar: Michael Nesmith
Bass: Jerry Yester
Drums: Micky Dolenz
Percussion: Davy Jones
Tack Piano: Peter Tork
Engineered by: Hank Cicalo
A remake by the band; an earlier version was recorded in July 1966 during the sessions for the debut album featuring session musicians.
Recorded at RCA Victor Studio C, Hollywood, March 17 and 19, 1967

"For Pete's Sake"
Written by Joseph Richards and Peter Tork
Lead vocal by Micky Dolenz
Backing vocals: Micky Dolenz, Davy Jones, Peter Tork
Electric Guitar: Peter Tork
Organ: Michael Nesmith
Bass: Chip Douglas
Drums: Micky Dolenz
Tambourine: Davy Jones
An edited mix became the closing theme for the second season of the band's NBC-TV sitcom
Recorded at RCA Victor Studio C, Hollywood, March 23 and 24, 1967

"Mr. Webster"
Written by Tommy Boyce and Bobby Hart
Lead vocal by Micky Dolenz
Backing vocals: Davy Jones
Electric 6-string guitar: Micky Dolenz
Steel Guitar: Michael Nesmith
Bass: John London
Tambourine: Davy Jones
Piano: Peter Tork
Engineered by: Hank Cicalo
A remake by the band; an earlier, slower version with session musicians was recorded during the sessions for More of the Monkees and is featured on Missing Links Volume Two
Recorded at RCA Victor Studio C, Hollywood, February 24, 1967

"Sunny Girlfriend"
Written by Michael Nesmith
Lead vocal by Michael Nesmith
Harmony vocals: Micky Dolenz
Backing vocals: Davy Jones
Electric 6-String Guitar: Peter Tork
Electric 12-String Guitar: Michael Nesmith
Acoustic Guitar: Michael Nesmith
Bass: John London
Drums: Micky Dolenz
Shaker: Micky Dolenz
Engineered by: Hank Cicalo
Mike and Micky recorded the song's vocals on a separate track featuring Mike on guitar and Micky with shaker.
Recorded at RCA Victor Studio A, Hollywood, February 23 and April 18, 1967

"Zilch"
Written by Micky Dolenz, Davy Jones, Michael Nesmith, and Peter Tork
Spoken words by Peter Tork, Davy Jones, Micky Dolenz, and Michael Nesmith
Engineered by: Hank Cicalo
A spoken-word collage made up of disparate phrases; the Monkees would sometimes enter public places performing it
Michael Nesmith claims the origin of "Mr Dobalina" was the name of a department Store manager in San Antonio. "My wife Phyllis and I were shopping when the page come over the speaker and I was immediately struck by the internal rhythm of the phrase."
(Peter's) Tork had heard the phrase "last boarding call for Mr. Dobalina, Mr. Bob Dobalina" coming from an airport intercom, (Davy's) "China Clipper..." came from the movie China Clipper, (Micky's) "Never mind the furthermore..." from the Rodgers and Hammerstein musical Oklahoma!, and (Mike's) "It is of my opinion..." from a political speech.
The line "Never mind the furthermore, the plea is self-defense" is also performed on the song "No Time".
"Zilch" was the 'hidden meaning' of it all; it added up to...nothing. It was simply entertaining nonsense, a fact betrayed by the laughter of Micky and Mike as they break up during the session.
The Headquarters Sessions compilation features the four spoken tracks separately to reveal everything that was said
"Zilch" was used in the TV series episode "The Picture Frame" during the police interrogation scene when Mike, Micky, and Davy are commanded by the Sergeant (Dort Clark) to "start talking!" and the boys initially respond with "Zilch"'s lyrics.
"Zilch" was sampled on "Mistadobalina", a 1991 song by alternative hip hop musician Del Tha Funkee Homosapien.
The line, "Never mind the furthermore, the plea is self defence" features in the They Might Be Giants song "Memo To Human Resources".  Zilch itself is occasionally part of the They Might Be Giants live show, and was performed throughout the 2010 tour promoting their children's album, Here Comes Science.
In the stereo release of the composition, Peter and Micky can be heard through one speaker while Davy and Mike can be heard through the other.
Recorded at RCA Victor Studio C, Hollywood, March 3, 1967

"No Time"
Written by the four Monkees (according to Peter, composition was done primarily by Micky and Mike). However, as a fiscal 'thank you' for an extra week spent on the album, as well as his patience & technical mentoring, the band credited the song to recording engineer Hank Cicalo, guaranteeing him a sizable royalty check, from which (Hank) bought a home. The released version of the song was the second version recorded for the album; the first included session help from guitarists Keith Allison and Jerry Yester, but the released version has only Chip Douglas assisting the quartet.
Lead vocal by Micky Dolenz
Backing vocals: Davy Jones, and Unknown
Electric Guitar: Michael Nesmith, and Unknown
Bass: Chip Douglas
Drums: Micky Dolenz
Tambourine: Davy Jones
Piano: Peter Tork
Engineered by: Hank Cicalo
Micky's "Rock on, George, for Ringo one time" refers to the Beatles' version of "Honey Don't."
The musical style of the song is also very similar to that of the Beatles' version of "Boys."
"Andy, you're a dandy, you don't seem to make no sense" is a reference to Andy Warhol.
Recorded at RCA Victor Studio C, Hollywood, March 17 and 22, 1967

"Early Morning Blues and Greens"
Written by Diane Hildebrand and Jack Keller
Lead vocal by Davy Jones
Harmony vocals: Peter Tork
Electric 12-String Guitar: Michael Nesmith
Bass: Chip Douglas
Drums: Micky Dolenz
Jawbone: Davy Jones
Maracas: Davy Jones
Electric Piano: Peter Tork
Organ: Peter Tork
Engineered by: Hank Cicalo
Recorded at RCA Victor Studio C, Hollywood, March 18 and 22, 1967

"Randy Scouse Git"
Written by Micky Dolenz
Lead vocal by Micky Dolenz
Backing vocals: Davy Jones, Peter Tork, Michael Nesmith
Electric Guitar: Michael Nesmith
Bass: Chip Douglas
Drums: Micky Dolenz
Timpani: Micky Dolenz
Percussion: Davy Jones
Organ: Peter Tork
Piano: Peter Tork
Engineered by: Hank Cicalo
Title is a British slang phrase gleaned by Dolenz from television, likely the UK sitcom Till Death Us Do Part; it roughly translates as "lustful fool from Liverpool" (Wiktionary: randy, Scouse, git) (though in fact, to call someone a "git" in Britain is the equivalent of "jerk" or "prat"). In the series the word was aimed by Alf Garnett at his son-in-law, played by Tony Booth, former British Prime Minister Tony Blair's father-in-law.
To avoid offence in the UK the song was billed as "Alternate Title."
"The four kings of EMI" is a reference to the Beatles, who were signed to EMI's Parlophone label at the time.
The opening drum riff of "Randy Scouse Git" can be heard in the Season One episode, "Monkees A La Mode," played absentmindedly by Micky on a table.
During rehearsal and set-up for recording of "Randy Scouse Git" a demo of Mike's instrumental "Cantata & Fugue In C&W" was inserted in the mistaken belief that it was part of Micky's guitar demo of his song.
Recorded at RCA Victor Studio B, Hollywood, March 2, and Studio C, March 4 and 8, 1967

Several instrumental jams (available on The Headquarters Sessions) were taped by Chip Douglas which The Monkees apparently intended for inclusion on the album. The group (with bassist John London) jammed an instrumental cover of the song "Memphis Tennessee" in which Peter's guitar grooving (and some of London's bass work and Davy's tambourine) overshoots the ending; after Micky good-naturedly curses out Peter ("Aw, Peter! You had to screw it up!") and bashes his drums for effect, he decides, "We'll cut him off, just cut off the track (for the ending)," to which Mike replies, "No, don't cut off the track, it was groovy until [the ending]." Following this jam the group broke into a ferocious three-minute improvisation (dubbed "Twelve-String Improvisation" on The Headquarters Sessions) led by Mike's take-off of the guitar riff from the Beatles' "Day Tripper" and quickly joined by Peter's riffing, Micky's drums, London's bass and Davy's tambourine. Following the jam Micky is heard laughing and says, "Whoa! I gotta hear this!" and Peter asks Douglas, "Can we hear that back?" while a surprised Mike says, "Oh, they didn't tape that, did they?"

Another instrumental track intended for the album was a rock number, "Masking Tape" (credited to Barry Mann and Cynthia Weil but authorship has also been listed as unknown) which the group recorded with bassist Jerry Yester. One take was recorded: before the take Micky and Chip Douglas run through one of the song's verses. At the end of the performance Micky exclaims, "Whoa! That was it!" but producer Douglas protests, "No, that wasn't it, it slowed down in the middle, but it's getting close." For some reason the song was never finished.

Peter, Mike, Micky and his sister Coco recorded demos early in the sessions. Peter's demo of "Seeger's Theme" was instrumental, while Mike's and the Dolenzes' demos ("Nine Times Blue" and the Buffy Saint Marie composition "Until It's Time for You to Go" by Mike (who had first released it as a single in 1965); "She'll Be There" and "Midnight Train" by Micky and Coco) featured full vocals over acoustic guitar. Mike and the Dolenzes' demos took place in one session, as before Mike's demo of "Until It's Time" Chip Douglas is heard teasing that Mike is demoing under his old pseudonym 'Michael Blessing' to the laughter of Micky and Coco.

Bonus tracks session information 
"All of Your Toys" (Early Mono Mix)
Written by Bill Martin
Lead vocal by Micky Dolenz
Backing vocals: Micky Dolenz, Davy Jones, Michael Nesmith, Peter Tork
Electric 12-String Guitar: Michael Nesmith
Bass: John London
Drums: Micky Dolenz
Tambourine: Davy Jones
Harpsichord: Peter Tork
Engineered by Dick Bogert, Hank Cicalo, and Rich Schmidt
Unused track that was the proposed A-side of the next Monkees single, but song was not controlled by the Monkees' publishing company, Screen Gems; publisher Tickson Music refused to sell the copyright.
Originally featured on Missing Links in stereo. The track is also included on the Listen to the Band and Music Box sets in slightly different stereo mixes, and Monkeemania (The Very Best of the Monkees) in the same stereo mix presented on Missing Links.
Recorded at RCA Victor Studios, Hollywood, January 16, 19, 23, 24, 30, 31, and February 2, 1967

"The Girl I Knew Somewhere" (First Recorded Version + Mono Mix)
Written by Michael Nesmith
Lead vocal by Michael Nesmith
Backing vocals: Micky Dolenz, Davy Jones, Peter Tork
Electric 12-String Guitar: Michael Nesmith
Acoustic Guitar: Peter Tork
Bass: John London
Drums: Micky Dolenz
Tambourine: Davy Jones
Harpsichord: Peter Tork
Engineered by Dick Bogert, Hank Cicalo, and Rich Schmidt
First known recording for the Headquarters album
Originally recorded with just electric guitar (played by Mike), acoustic guitar (Peter), drums (Micky), bass (John London), and tambourine (Davy), a complex harpsichord piece was added when Peter accidentally played the harpsichord during a rehearsal and the note that came out blended with the song to the enthusiastic satisfaction of Mike.
Recorded at RCA Victor Studios, Hollywood, January 16, 19, 23, 24, 30, 31, and February 2, 1967

"Peter Gunn's Gun" (Jam Session)
Written by Henry Mancini
Spoken words by Peter Tork, Micky Dolenz and Michael Nesmith
Steel Guitar: Michael Nesmith
Drums: Micky Dolenz
Tambourine: Davy Jones
Piano: Peter Tork
Engineered by: Hank Cicalo
This was one of numerous studio jams the boys concocted during recording.
Recorded at RCA Victor Studio C, Hollywood, March 11, 1967

"Jericho" (Studio Dialogue + Mono)
Traditional, arranged by Micky Dolenz, Davy Jones, Peter Tork and Chip Douglas
Lead vocals by Micky Dolenz and Peter Tork
Vocal by Chip Douglas
French Horn: Davy Jones
Engineered by: Hank Cicalo
This was recorded during a break from regular sessions when Davy starts fooling around with a French horn, Peter and Chip make fun of his playing by referencing Al Hirt. Micky soon cuts in with a shtick about "Jericho's Wall" after Douglas mentions it and amid the laughter, the conversation spirals into a spontaneous vocal jam by Peter and Micky of the song "Jericho."
A longer, unedited version appears on the Headquarters Sessions compilation
Recorded at RCA Victor Studio C, Hollywood, March 10, 1967

"Nine Times Blue" (Demo Version + Mono)
Written by Michael Nesmith
Lead vocal by Michael Nesmith
Acoustic 12-String Guitar: Michael Nesmith
Later re-recorded during the sessions for The Birds, The Bees & The Monkees and released on Missing Links
Recorded at RCA Victor Studios, Hollywood, February, 1967

"She'll Be There" (Acoustic Duet + Mono)
Written by Sharon Sheeley and Raul Abeyta
Lead vocal by Micky Dolenz
Harmony vocal: Coco Dolenz (Micky's sister)
Acoustic Guitar: Micky Dolenz
Engineered by: Hank Cicalo
Micky and his sister Coco were responsible for the arrangement of the song "She'll Be There". However it was unknown exactly who wrote it at the time, and as a result no official writer's credit was given.
Originally released on Missing Links Volume Three
Recorded at RCA Victor Studios, Hollywood, February, 1967

"Midnight Train" (Demo Version + Mono)
Written by Micky Dolenz
Lead vocal by Micky Dolenz
Harmony vocal: Coco Dolenz
Acoustic Guitar: Micky Dolenz
Engineered by: Hank Cicalo
Later recut during the sessions for The Monkees Present and released on Changes
(available on "Headquarters Sessions")
While Micky Dolenz is officially credited as the writer of the song, several sites and sources claim Chris McCarty, Kenny Lee Lewis and Steve Miller to have co-written the track. 
Originally released on Missing Links Volume Three
Recorded at RCA Victor Studios, Hollywood, February, 1967

"Pillow Time" (Studio Dialogue + Mono)
Written by Janelle Scott (Micky's mother) and Matt Willis
Spoken words by Micky Dolenz and Hank Cicalo
Zither: Micky Dolenz
Engineered by: Hank Cicalo
This was recorded when Micky was helping engineer Hank Cicalo with studio echo effects. Micky also plays on a zither that can be heard on the opening of the original album.
A longer, unedited version of this session is featured on the Headquarters Sessions compilation.
Later recorded and released on The Monkees Present
Recorded at RCA Victor Studio C, Hollywood, March 14, 1967

2007 deluxe CD reissue bonus tracks session information 
all tracks produced by Chip Douglas unless otherwise specified.

"A Little Bit Me, a Little Bit You" (Stereo Remix)
Written by Neil Diamond
Lead vocal by Davy Jones
Backing vocals: Neil Diamond and Unknown
Guitars: Al Gorgoni, Don Thomas, Hugh McCracken
Bass: Lou Mauro 
Drums: Herb Lovelle 
Clavinet: Stan Free
Organ: Arthur Butler 
Tambourine: Thomas Cerone
Produced and arranged by: Jeff Barry 
Engineered by: Ray Hall 
Recorded at RCA Studio B, New York City, January 21 and February 4, 5, 6 and 8, 1967

"She Hangs Out" (Single Version + Stereo Remix)
Written by Jeff Barry
Lead vocal by Davy Jones
Backing vocal: Unknown
Guitars: Al Gorgoni, Don Thomas, Hugh McCracken 
Bass: Louis Mauro, James Tyrell 
Drums: Herb Lovelle 
Clavinet: Stan Free 
Organ: Arthur Butler 
Tambourine: Thomas Cerone 
Produced and Arranged By: Jeff Barry 
Engineered By: Ray Hall 
The song was written by Jeff Barry and Ellie Greenwich. However, only Barry received writer's credit
Later re-recorded and released on Pisces, Aquarius, Capricorn & Jones Ltd.
Recorded at RCA Studio B, New York City, January 21 (11:00 A.M. - 7:00 P.M.) and 24, and February 4 and 5, 1967
 
"Love to Love" (Alternate Stereo Remix)
Written by Neil Diamond
Lead vocal by Davy Jones 
Guitars: Al Gorgoni, Don Thomas, Hugh McCracken 
Bass: Louis Mauro, James Tyrell 
Drums: Herb Lovelle 
Clavinet: Stan Free 
Organ: Arthur Butler 
Tambourine: Thomas Cerone 
Produced and Arranged By: Jeff Barry 
Engineered By: Ray Hall 
A new vocal track was recorded by Jones in 1969 for The Monkees Present, but left unreleased until Missing Links Volume Three. In 2016, Micky Dolenz and Peter Tork contributed new backing vocals to the 1969 version for Good Times!.
Recorded at RCA Studio B, New York City, January 21, 24, February 4 and 5, 1967, and August 5, 1969

"You Can't Tie a Mustang Down" (Stereo Remix)
Written by Jeff Barry, Jerry Leiber and Mike Stoller
Lead Vocal: Davy Jones 
Guitars: Al Gorgoni, Don Thomas, Hugh McCracken 
Bass: Louis Mauro, James Tyrell 
Drums: Herb Lovelle 
Clavinet: Stan Free 
Organ: Arthur Butler 
Tambourine: Thomas Cerone 
Produced and Arranged By: Jeff Barry
Engineered By: Ray Hall 
Recorded at RCA Studio B, New York City, January 21 and 24, and February 4, 1967

"If I Learned to Play the Violin" (Stereo Remix)
Written by Joey Levine and Artie Resnick
Lead vocal by Davy Jones
Guitars: Sal Ditroia, Don Thomas, Hugh McCracken
Bass: James Tyrell
Drums: Herb Lovelle
Clavinet: Stan Free
Organ: Arthur Butler
Tambourine: Thomas Cerone
Produced and Arranged By: Jeff Barry
Engineered By: Ray Hall 
Recorded at RCA Studio B, New York City, January 26, and February 4 and 6, 1967

"99 Pounds" (Stereo Remix)
Written by Jeff Barry
Lead vocal by Davy Jones
Backing vocals: Unknown
Guitars: Al Gorgoni, Don Thomas, Hugh McCracken 
Bass: Louis Mauro, James Tyrell 
Drums: Herb Lovelle 
Clavinet: Stan Free 
Organ: Arthur Butler 
Tambourine: Thomas Cerone 
Produced and Arranged By: Jeff Barry 
Engineered By: Ray Hall 
Recorded at RCA Studio B, New York City, January 21 and 24, and February 4, 5 and 6, 1967

"The Girl I Knew Somewhere" (Single Version + Stereo Remix)
Written by Michael Nesmith
Lead vocal by Micky Dolenz
Backing vocals: Micky Dolenz, Michael Nesmith, Peter Tork
Electric 12-String Guitar: Michael Nesmith
Acoustic 12-String Guitar: Michael Nesmith
Bass: John London
Drums: Micky Dolenz
Tambourine: John London
Harpsichord: Peter Tork
Recorded at RCA Victor Studio A, Hollywood, February 23, 1967

"Tema Dei Monkees" (Stereo Remix)
Written by Tommy Boyce and Bobby Hart, with Carlo Nistri
Lead vocal by Micky Dolenz
Harmony vocals by Tommy Boyce and Bobby Hart
Other personnel unknown
Produced by Tommy Boyce and Bobby Hart
In another key than the English version
Recording info unknown

Personnel
Michael Nesmith: vocals, 12-string guitar, pedal steel guitar, 6-string guitar, organ
Davy Jones: vocals, tambourine, jawbone, maracas, etc.
Micky Dolenz: vocals, drums, 6-string guitar, zither, timpani
Peter Tork: vocals, keyboards, 12-string guitar, bass guitar, 5-string banjo
Chip Douglas: bass guitar
John London: bass guitar on "The Girl I Knew Somewhere" and "All of Your Toys"
Vincent DeRosa: French Horn on "Shades of Gray"
 Fred Seykora: cello on "Shades of Gray"
 Jerry Yester: additional guitar on "No Time"
 Keith Allison: additional guitar on "No Time"

Charts

Album

Single

Certifications

References

Bibliography
The Monkees: The Day-By-Day Story of the 60s TV Pop Sensation by Andrew Sandoval
1001 Albums You Must Hear Before You Die by Robert Dimery, ed (2006).

External links

Headquarters (Adobe Flash) at Radio3Net (streamed copy where licensed)

The Monkees albums
1967 albums
Arista Records albums
RCA Records albums
Rhino Records albums
Sundazed Records albums
Colgems Records albums
Albums produced by Chip Douglas